This article highlights the campuses of the University of Hong Kong.

The university also has a few buildings in Sandy Bay Gap. HKU buildings are some of the few remaining examples of British colonial architecture in Hong Kong. The university lends its name to HKU station, the main public transport access to the campus (and the Lung Fu Shan and Shek Tong Tsui neighbourhoods), opened on 28 December 2014.

The Li Ka Shing Faculty of Medicine is situated 4.5 km southwest of the main campus, in the Southern District near Sandy Bay and Pok Fu Lam. The medical campus includes Queen Mary Hospital, the William M.W. Mong Building and research facilities. The Faculty of Dentistry is situated in the Prince Philip Dental Hospital, Sai Ying Pun.

The university also operates the Kadoorie Agricultural Research Centre, which occupies  of land in the New Territories, and the Swire Institute of Marine Science at the southern tip of the Cape d'Aguilar Peninsula on Hong Kong Island.

The Main Building 
It is built in the post-renaissance style with red brick and granite and has two courtyards. The main elevation is articulated by four turrets with a central clock tower (a gift from Sir Paul Chater in 1930). The two courtyards were added in the south in 1952 and one floor in the end block in 1958. The building was originally used as classrooms and laboratories for the Faculty of Medicine and Engineering and was later the home of departments within the Faculty of Arts. The central Great Hall (Loke Yew Hall) is named after Loke Yew, a Malayan benefactor of the university in its early years. It became a declared monument in 1984.

University Hall

Swire Building 
In around 1980, the Swire Group sponsored the building of a new residential hall in the eastern end of the campus. Because of the sponsorship, the new student residence was named Swire Building. The building was officially opened by Mr. John Anthony Swire  on 11 November 1980. In 1983, the colour orange was chosen to be the hall colour in the second annual general meeting since the colour was used as the background colour during the first open day of Swire Hall and no other halls were using orange as their hall colour.

In 1983, Mrs. J. Lau (Director of Centre Media Resources) provided a design for the hall logo. The Swire Hall Students' Association, HKUSU, then made some amendments to that design. The logo shows the words 'S' and 'H'. The design of the word 'S' looks like two hands holding each other, signifying that all hall-mates should co-operate with each other, and promoting the hall motto 'Unity and Sincerity'.

Hung Hing Ying Building 
Financed by Sir Paul Chater, Professor G. P. Jordan and others,  was opened in 1919 by the Governor of Hong Kong Sir Reginald Stubbs and housed the students' union. After World War II, the building was used temporarily for administrative purposes. The East Wing was added in 1960. The building was converted into the Senior Common Room in 1974. It was named in honour of Mr Hung Hing-Ying in 1986 for his family's donations to the university. The building was subsequently used again for administrative purposes, and housed Department of Music and the Music Library until early 2013. It is currently used by the Development & Alumni Affairs Office. The two-storey Edwardian style structure is characterised by a central dome and the use of red brick to emulate the Main Building opposite. The building became a declared monument in 1995.

Eliot Hall and May Hall 
Eliot Hall, named after Charles Eliot, who was the first vice chancellor, serves as an office building. May Hall, named after Governor of Hong Kong Francis Henry May, is also an office building. Eliot opened in 1914 and May opened in 1915. In 1969 Old Halls was formed whilst Eliot, Lugard, and May halls combined. The university razed the Lugard section in 1992, and the remaining sections became the separate Eliot and May halls.

Hornell Hall 
Hornell Hall is a hall for male students though it has no dormitories.

Lugard Hall 
Lugard Hall was demolished.

Tang Chi Ngong Building 
The  is on the campus. The idea to establish a school of Chinese was proposed in the inter-war period. Construction of the premises began in 1929 following a donation from Tang Chi-ngong, father of the philanthropist Sir Shiu-kin Tang, after whom the building was named. It was opened by Sir William Peel, Governor of Hong Kong, in 1931 and since then further donations have been received for the endowment of teaching Chinese language and literature. The building has been used for other purposes since the 1970s but the name remained unchanged. At present, it houses the Centre of Asian Studies. This three-storey flat-roofed structure is surfaced with Shanghai plaster and became a declared monument in 1995.

Dormitories 

In 2017 the university announced plans to make a new 1,228-student, 17-storey dormitory from pre-made components.

Centennial Campus 
To provide additional space for students under the new four-year undergraduate curriculum the Centennial Campus was built at the western end of the main campus, which was previously occupied by the Water Supplies Department.

The university in 2007 was determining what the new campus would be like. To make space for this campus, the university established new reservoirs in caverns below ground and put the new buildings where the former reservoirs were.

The construction of the campus started in late 2009, and was completed in 2012, the first year of the introduction of the new academic structure in Hong Kong. In 2012, the Faculty of Arts, the Faculty of Law and the Faculty of Social Sciences moved to the Centennial Campus.

Jockey Club Student Village III

References

University of Hong Kong